The 2018 Liga 3 West Java (known as Liga 3 Super Jalapa (Jago Bola Pasundan)) is the third edition of Liga 3 (formerly known as Liga Nusantara) West Java as a qualifying round for the national round of 2018 Liga 3. PSKC Cimahi, winner of the 2017 Liga 3 West Java are the defending champions. The competition started on 29 April 2018.

Format
In this competition, 42 teams are divided into 6 groups of seven. The two best teams are through to knockout stage. The winner will represent West Java in national round of 2018 Liga 3.

Teams
There are initially 42 clubs which will participate the league in this season. But it became 41 after Bone F.C. withdraw before their first match.

Group stage
This stage scheduled starts on 29 April 2018.
Result of this stage:
29/04,30/04a,30/04b,02/05a,02/05b,03/05,05/05,06/05

Group A
 All matches will be held at Tambun Stadium, Bekasi

Group B
 All matches will be held at Wiradaha Stadium, Tasikmalaya

Group C
 All matches will be held at Anda S. Dipura Stadium, Karawang

Group D
 All matches will be held at Angkasa Lanud Sulaeman Stadium, Bandung

Group E
 All matches will be held at Warung Jambu Stadium, Majalengka

Group F
 All matches will be held at KONI Stadium, Citeureup

References 

2018 in Indonesian football
Sport in West Java